Karen Theresa Like (born 14 October 1966 in Cinderford) is a British slalom canoeist who competed from the mid-1980s to the early 1990s. She won a bronze medal in the K-1 team event at the 1985 ICF Canoe Slalom World Championships in Augsburg. She also finished 13th in the K-1 event at the 1992 Summer Olympics in Barcelona.

References
 Sports-Reference.com profile

1966 births
English female canoeists
Canoeists at the 1992 Summer Olympics
Living people
Olympic canoeists of Great Britain
People from Cinderford
British female canoeists
Sportspeople from Gloucestershire
Medalists at the ICF Canoe Slalom World Championships